Rafael Nadal was the competition's defending champion but withdrew before the start of the competition and was replaced by Roberto Bautista Agut.

Seeds

Draw

Draw

Play-offs

Additional exhibition matches

References

External links
Official website

World Tennis Championship
2017 in Emirati tennis
World Tennis Championship
December 2017 sports events in Asia